Bis(triphenylphosphine)palladium chloride is a coordination compound of palladium containing two triphenylphosphine and two chloride ligands. It is a yellow solid that is soluble in some organic solvents.  It is used for palladium-catalyzed coupling reactions, e.g. the Sonogashira–Hagihara reaction. The complex is square planar. Many analogous complexes are known with different phosphine ligands.

Preparation and reactions 
This compound may be prepared by treating palladium(II) chloride with triphenylphosphine:
PdCl2  +  2 PPh3  →   PdCl2(PPh3)2
Upon reduction with hydrazine in the presence of excess triphenylphosphine, the complex is a precursor to tetrakis(triphenylphosphine)palladium, Pd(PPh3)4:
2 PdCl2(PPh3)2  +  4 PPh3 + 5 N2H4  →  2 Pd(PPh3)4  +  N2  +  4 N2H5+Cl−

Structure
Several crystal structures containing PdCl2(PPh3)2 have been reported. In all of the structures, PdCl2(PPh3)2 adopts a square planar coordination geometry and the trans isomeric form.

Applications
The complex is used as a pre-catalyst for a variety of coupling reactions.
 
The Suzuki reaction was once limited by high levels of catalyst and the limited availability of boronic acids. Replacements for halides were also found, increasing the number of coupling partners for the halide or pseudohalide as well. Using bis(triphenylphosphine)palladium chloride as the catalyst, triflates and boronic acids have been coupled on an 80 kilogram scale in good yield.  The same catalyst is effective for the Sonogashira coupling.

See also
 Bis(triphenylphosphine)platinum(II) chloride
 Bis(triphenylphosphine)nickel(II) chloride

References

Palladium compounds
Triphenylphosphine complexes
Chlorides
Chloro complexes